22 Jump Street is a 2014 American satirical buddy cop action comedy film directed by Phil Lord and Christopher Miller, written by Jonah Hill, Michael Bacall, Oren Uziel and Rodney Rothman and produced by and starring Hill and Channing Tatum. Ice Cube, Peter Stormare, Jillian Bell, Amber Stevens, and Wyatt Russell also star. It is the sequel to the 2012 film 21 Jump Street, which is in turn based on the television series of the same name. The plot follows police officers Schmidt and Jenko as they go undercover at a college in order to find the supplier of a new drug.

Plans for a Jump Street sequel began the week of the first film's release. Hill and Tatum were quickly confirmed to be reprising their roles, while Miller and Lord announced they'd be returning to direct in July 2013. Filming took place from September to December of that same year in New Orleans, Louisiana, as well as San Juan, Puerto Rico.

The film was released on June 4, 2014 in New York City, and was theatrically released in the United States nine days later by TriStar Pictures and Metro-Goldwyn-Mayer. It received generally positive reviews, and grossed $331 million worldwide. A third film, as well as a possible crossover with the Men in Black franchise, were discussed but never came to fruition; a female-led spin-off was later in development but also did not come to fruition.

Plot
Two years following their success in the 21 Jump Street program, Schmidt and Jenko are back on the streets investigating narcotics trafficking. However, after failing in the pursuit of a group of drug dealers led by The Ghost, Deputy Chief Hardy puts the duo back on the undercover program to work for Captain Dickson – now located across the street at 22 Jump Street. Their assignment is to go undercover as college students and locate the supplier of a synthetic drug known as "WHY-PHY" (Work Hard? Yes, Play Hard? Yes) that killed a student photographed buying it on campus from a dealer.

At college, Jenko befriends a pair of jocks named Zook and Rooster, who soon become the prime suspects of the investigation. Jenko starts attending parties with the jocks who do not take as kindly to Schmidt. Meanwhile, Schmidt gets the attention of an art student, Maya, by feigning an interest in slam poetry. After hitting it off immediately, the two have sex together, to the chagrin of Maya's roommate Mercedes, and Schmidt later finds out that Maya is the daughter of Captain Dickson, whom Schmidt bragged to about "getting laid", much to his dismay. Despite sleeping together, Maya tells Schmidt not to take it seriously, and he starts to feel left out as Jenko bonds more and more with Zook who encourages him to join the football team.

When Schmidt and Jenko are unable to identify the dealer, they visit Mr. Walters and Eric in prison for advice (with Eric being in a forced relationship with Mr. Walters, who received a vagina after Schmidt shot his penis off), and Walters points out a unique tattoo on the arm of the dealer in the photograph. Whilst hanging out with Zook and Rooster, Jenko notices that Rooster does not have the tattoo but sees it on Zook's arm. Schmidt and Jenko are invited to join a fraternity led by the jocks, but Schmidt refuses, furthering the tension between the two as Jenko passes their requirements. They later realize that Zook is not the dealer but rather another customer. Soon afterwards, they find The Ghost and his men on campus, but The Ghost again evades them. Jenko reveals to Schmidt that he has been offered a football scholarship with Zook and is uncertain about his future as a police officer. Afterwards, Schmidt reveals his true identity and moves out of the dorm, angering Maya.

Spring break arrives, and Schmidt goes after The Ghost. He is joined by Jenko, so the two can have one final mission together. The pair head to the beach where The Ghost is likely to be dealing WHY-PHY. Inside a bar, they find Mercedes, who is The Ghost's daughter, giving instructions to other dealers. The pair, backed up by Dickson and the rest of Jump Street, ambush the meeting. The Ghost flees, while Mercedes is knocked out by Schmidt. While pursuing The Ghost, Jenko is shot in the shoulder. The Ghost attempts to escape in a helicopter; Schmidt and Jenko manage to jump across to it, but they fall into the sea and Jenko is able to throw a grenade into the helicopter. The Ghost celebrates his victory prematurely while the grenade explodes. Jenko tells Schmidt that he still wants to be a police officer as he believes their differences help their partnership, and the two reconcile in front of a cheering crowd. Dickson approaches them claiming to have a new mission undercover at a medical school.

During the end credits, Jenko and Schmidt go on a variety of undercover missions to different schools, which are portrayed as 22 fictional sequels, an animated series, a video game, and a toy line. One mission features Detective Booker while another sees the return of The Ghost, who survived the helicopter explosion. The post-credits scene shows Eric and Mr. Walters lying in bed together, with Mr. Walters revealing that he's pregnant with Eric's child.

Cast
 Jonah Hill as Morton Schmidt
 Channing Tatum as Greg Jenko / Jeff
 Peter Stormare as The Ghost
 Wyatt Russell as Zook Haythe
 Amber Stevens as Maya Dickson
 Jillian Bell as Mercedes
 Ice Cube as Captain Dickson
 Keith Lucas as Keith Yang
 Kenny Lucas as Kenny Yang
 Nick Offerman as Deputy Chief Hardy
 Jimmy Tatro as Rooster
 Craig Roberts as Spencer
 Marc Evan Jackson as Dr. Murphy
 Queen Latifah as Mrs. Dickson (uncredited)
 Diplo as Himself
 Dustin Nguyen as Vietnamese Jesus / Harry Truman Ioki
 Richard Grieco as Dennis Booker
 Dave Franco as Eric Molson (uncredited)
 Rob Riggle as Mr. Walters (uncredited)
 H. Jon Benjamin as MCS Football Coach (uncredited)
 Patton Oswalt as MC State History Professor (uncredited)
 Bill Hader as Culinary School Villain (uncredited)
 Anna Faris as Anna (uncredited)
 Seth Rogen as a Morton Schmidt replacement actor (uncredited)

Production
On March 17, 2012, Sony Pictures announced that it was pursuing a sequel to 21 Jump Street, signing a deal that would see Jonah Hill and Michael Bacall return to write a script treatment that would be again developed by Bacall and undergo rewrites by Oren Uziel and Rodney Rothman. The film was originally scheduled to be released on June 6, 2014. On May 8, 2013, it was announced that the film would be pushed back a week until June 13, 2014. In June 2013, it was announced the film would be titled 22 Jump Street. In July 2013, Phil Lord and Christopher Miller confirmed they would return to direct the film. On September 6, 2013, Amber Stevens joined the cast of the film. On September 27, 2013, Kurt Russell mentioned that his son Wyatt turned down a role in The Hunger Games sequels to star in 22 Jump Street. Principal photography began on September 28, 2013, in New Orleans, Louisiana, with shots in San Juan, Puerto Rico as well (acting for the shots in the movie as the spring break in "Puerto Mexico") and ended on December 15, 2013. On-campus scenes featuring the fictional MC State were filmed on the uptown campus of Tulane University.

According to Phil Lord and Christopher Miller in the home release commentary, they wanted Cate Blanchett for the end credits sequence in a cameo as a follow-up to the carte blanche joke, but she was busy with Carol, The Monuments Men and How to Train Your Dragon 2.

The end titles, featuring satirical concepts for an ongoing series of Jump Street films and merchandise, were designed by the studio Alma Mater.

Music
The score for the film was composed by Mark Mothersbaugh and was released by La-La Land Records on a double disc album, limited to 2,000 copies, in September 2014. The second disc of the album also contains the score from the film's predecessor, 21 Jump Street, composed by Mothersbaugh as well.

Track listing

Credits
Album Credits
 Music Composed by Mark Mothersbaugh
 Music Produced by Mark Mothersbaugh
 Music Editors: Andy Dorfman & Katie Greathouse
 Recorded by Brad Haehnel at The Sony Scoring Stage and Mutato Muzika
 Mixed by Brad Haehnel at Noise Alchemy
 Mix Assistant: John Aspinall
 Music Preparation: JoAnn Kane Music Services
 Music Librarian: Mark Graham
 Soundtrack Executive Producer: Neal Moritz
 Executive in Charge of Music for Sony Pictures: Lia Vollack
 Executive Producers for La-La Land Records: MV Gerhard and Matthew Verboys
 Album Mastered by: James Nelson at Digital Outland
 Art Direction by: Dan Goldwasser at Warm Butter Design

Performer Credits
 Conductor: James T. Sale
 Contractor: Peter Rotter
 Violins: Bruce Dukov (cm), Mark Robertson (P2), Rebecca Bunnell, Darius Campo, Roberto Cani, Kevin Connolly, Nina Evtuhov, Lorenz Gamma, Julie Ann Gigante, Jessica Guideri, Tamara Hatwan, Amy Hershberger, Maia Jasper, Aimee Kreston, Ana Landauer, Songa Lee, Natalie Leggett, Dimitrie Leivici, Phillip Levy, Helen Nightengale, Grace E. Oh, Alyssa Park, Sara Parkins, Katia Popov, Rafael Rishik, Jay Rosen, Neil Samples, Marc Sazer, Lisa Sutton, Sarah Thornblade, Josefina Vergara, Irina Voloshina, Roger Wilkie
Violas: Brian Dembow (1st), Robert Brophy, Thomas Diener, Andrew Duckles, Alma Fernandez, Matthew Funes, Keith Greene, Jennie Hansen, Pamela Jacobson, Roland Kato, Shawn Mann, Darrin McCann, Victoria Miskolczy, David Walther
 Cellos: Steve Erdody (1st), Erika Duke-Kirkpatrick, Vanessa Freebairn-Smith, Trevor Handy, Paula Hochhalter, Armen Ksajikian, Timothy Landauer, George Kim Scholes, Andrew Shulman, Christina Soule, Cecilia Tsan, John Walz
 Bass: Michael Valerio (1st), Nico Carmine Abondolo, Drew Dembowski, Stephen Dress, Oscar Hidalgo, Christian Kollgaard, Edward Meares, Bruce Morgenthaler, Susan Ranney
 Sax: Daniel Higgins
 French Horns: James Thatcher (1st), Mark Adams, Steven Becknell, Dylan Hart, Daniel Kelley, Jenny Kim, Danielle Ondarza
 Trumpets: David Washburn (1st), Wayne Bergeron, Jon Lewis, Daniel Rosenboom
 Trombones: William Booth (1st), Alexander Iles, Andrew Thomas Malloy, William Reichenbach
 Tuba: Doug Tornquist
 Guitar: John E. Enroth
 Percussion: Donald Williams, James T. Sale
 Orchestrators: James T. Sale, Christopher Guardino, Jeff Schindler

22 Jump Street (Original Motion Picture Soundtrack)
A soundtrack album was also released, featuring songs used in the film and others specially released for it. The first single was "22 Jump Street", performed by Angel Haze and Ludacris. Songs such as "Turn Down for What" by DJ Snake and Lil Jon, "Higher" by Creed, #STUPiDFACEDD" by wallpaper., "Drop Girl" by Ice Cube and others were used during the film, but weren't included in the album. It was released on 10 June 2014 and reached #129 on Billboard 200, #4 in US Top Electronic Albums and #6 in US Top Soundtrack Albums.

Release

Box office
22 Jump Street grossed $191.7 million in North America and $139.4 million in other countries for a worldwide total of $331.3 million, against a budget of $84.5 million. It outgrossed the first Jump Street film, which made a total of $201.6 million during its theatrical run. Deadline Hollywood calculated the net profit of the film to be $144.4 million, when factoring together "production budgets, P&A, talent participations and other costs, with box office grosses, and ancillary revenues from VOD to DVD and TV," placing it 10th on their list of 2014's "Most Valuable Blockbusters".

22 Jump Street grossed $5.5 million at its early Thursday night showings. On its opening day it grossed $25 million, including the early Thursday showings. In North America, the film opened at number one in its first weekend, with $57.1 million. In its second weekend, the film dropped to number two, grossing an additional $27.5 million. In its third weekend, the film stayed at number two, grossing $15.8 million. In its fourth weekend, the film dropped to number three, grossing $9.8 million.

Critical response
On Rotten Tomatoes the film has an approval rating of 84% based on 224 reviews, with an average rating of 7.00/10. The site's critical consensus reads, "Boasting even more of the bromantic chemistry between its stars -- and even more of the goofy, good-natured humor that made its predecessor so much fun – 22 Jump Street is the rare sequel that improves upon the original." On Metacritic, the film has a weighted average score of 71 out of 100, based on 46 critics, indicating "generally favorable reviews". Audiences polled by CinemaScore gave the film an average grade of "A−" on an A+ to F scale, higher than the 'B' received by its predecessor.

Inkoo Kang of The Wrap gave the film a positive review, saying "If 22 isn't as trim and tight as its predecessor, it's certainly smarter and more heartfelt. Whether this sequel is better than the original is up for debate, but the franchise has definitely grown up." Chris Nashawaty of Entertainment Weekly gave the film a B−, saying "Hill's neurotic-motormouth act and Tatum's lovable-lunkhead shtick still shoot giddy sparks." Claudia Puig of USA Today gave the film three out of four stars, saying "This is the ultimate meta movie. The repetition is exactly the point." Kyle Smith of the New York Post gave the film two out of four stars, saying "What's the difference between 21 Jump Street and 22 Jump Street? Same as the difference between getting a 21 and a 22 at blackjack."

Jocelyn Noveck of the Associated Press gave the film three out of four stars, saying "Hill and Tatum ... have a Laurel-and-Hardy-like implausible chemistry that keeps you laughing pretty much no matter what they're doing." Bill Goodykoontz of The Arizona Republic gave the film four out of five stars, saying "What makes it all work is the chemistry between Hill and Tatum, which in turn, of course, is a rich source of the film's humor." Michael Phillips of the Chicago Tribune gave the film three out of four stars, saying "The peculiar sweetness of 21 Jump Street has taken a hiatus in 22 Jump Street, a brazen sequel that's both slightly disappointing and a reliable, often riotous 'laffer' in the old Variety trade-magazine parlance." Peter Travers of Rolling Stone gave the film three out of four stars, saying "22 Jump Street is damn funny, sometimes outrageously so. It laughs at its own dumb logic and invites us in on the fun." Joe Neumaier of the New York Daily News gave the film three out of four stars, saying "Like its stars, Jump Street gets extra credit for getting by on charm while sticking to the rules." Ian Buckwalter of NPR gave the film a seven out of ten, saying "What separates 22 Jump Street from sequel mediocrity is that everyone's in on the joke."

Sean Fitz-Gerald of The Denver Post gave the film three out of four stars, saying "Jump Street knows you know about the predictability and cheapness of sequels and rip-offs – and in this case, to avoid the downfalls of other summer comedy sagas, embracing that problem might have been the best move for this absurd, unique franchise." Betsy Sharkey of the Los Angeles Times gave the film a positive review, saying "This sequel's spoof of its predecessor's riff on the original 1980s-era buddy-cop TV show coalesces into a raucous, raunchy, irreverent, imperfect riot." Ty Burr of The Boston Globe gave the film three and a half stars out of four, saying "Lord and Miller are on a roll, and there may be no better moviemakers at playing to our modern need for irony – at giving us the entertainment we crave while acknowledging our distrust of it." Rene Rodriguez of the Miami Herald gave the film three out of four stars, saying "There's something going on at the edges of the frame in practically every scene of 22 Jump Street, a testament to the care and attention to detail directors Lord and Miller bring to this potentially silly material." Stephen Whitty of the Newark Star-Ledger gave the film two and a half stars out of four, saying "At what point is sarcasm just a cheap substitute for wit? Exactly when does joking about how all sequels are just lame, repetitive cash-grabs start to suggest that maybe yours is, too? Actually, in this case, about 40 minutes in." Bill Zwecker of the Chicago Sun-Times gave the film three out of four stars, saying "Though I enjoyed enormously this latest offering in the rebooted Jump franchise, it's the effortless, unexpected bromance/partnership between the two unlikely undercover cops is what makes this franchise work."

James Berardinelli of ReelViews gave the film two and a half stars out of four, saying "There are times when 22 Jump Street is borderline brilliant. Unfortunately, those instances are outnumbered by segments that don't work for one reason or another." Jaime N. Christley of Slant Magazine gave the film two out of four stars, saying "As funny and batshit insane as the movie often is, the fact that 22 Jump Street knows it's a tiresome sequel doesn't save it from being a tiresome sequel, even as Lord and Miller struggle to conceal the bitter pill of convention in the sweet tapioca pudding of wall-to-wall jokes." Scott Tobias of The Dissolve gave the film three and a half stars out of five, saying "22 Jump Street squeezes every last drop of comic inspiration it can get from Tatum and Hill, as well as the very notion of a sequel to such a superfluous enterprise."

Steve Persall of the Tampa Bay Times gave the film a B, saying "22 Jump Street is a mixed bag of clever spoofery and miscalculated outrageousness. The unveiled homoeroticism of practically all interaction between Jenko and Schmidt is amusing to the point when it isn't." Ann Hornaday of The Washington Post gave the film three out of five stars, saying "This is a sequel that wears its well-worn formula, mocking inside jokes and gleeful taste for overkill proudly, flying the high-lowbrow flag for audiences that like their comedy just smart enough to be not-too-dumb." Scott Foundas of Variety gave the film a positive review, saying "22 Jump Street hits far more often than it misses, and even when it misses by a mile, the effort is so delightfully zany that it's hard not to give Lord and Miller an 'A' for effort."

Peter Howell of the Toronto Star gave the film three out of four stars, saying "If it seemed Channing Tatum and Jonah Hill couldn't possibly exceed their over-the-top buddy cop antics of 21 Jump Street, you lost that bet." Tom Long of The Detroit News gave the film a B−, saying "There's no real reason 22 Jump Street should work. Yet it does." Joe Williams of the St. Louis Post-Dispatch gave the film three out of four stars, saying "A self-aware sequel has to hop over hurdles to keep from swallowing its own tail, but the sharp writing and tag-team antics lift 22 Jump Street to a high level." Mick LaSalle of the San Francisco Chronicle gave the film three out of four stars, saying "22 Jump Street is exactly what comedy is today. It's coarse, free-flowing and playful." In 2016, James Charisma of Playboy ranked the film #13 on a list of 15 Sequels That Are Way Better Than The Originals.

In her UK interview to promote the movie Carol in 2015, actress Cate Blanchett, who was referenced in the movie, was asked by Digital Spy if she seen the movie replying “someone has said that to me” saying she hasn't seen the movie and what she think of her reference in the movie from Channing Tatum with her and Carte Blanche replying “it’s a honor to be referenced by those fellows”.

Home media
22 Jump Street was released on DVD and Blu-ray on November 18, 2014.

Future
On September 10, 2014, 23 Jump Street was confirmed. Channing Tatum had yet to sign on to the project, stating, "I don't know if that joke works three times, so we'll see." On August 7, 2015, it was revealed that Lord and Miller would not direct the film, but instead write and produce. A first draft of the film's script has been completed. On December 10, 2014, it was revealed that Sony was planning a crossover between Men in Black and Jump Street. The news was leaked after Sony's system was hacked and then confirmed by the directors of the films, Lord and Miller, during an interview about it. James Bobin was announced as the director in March 2016. The title of the crossover was later revealed as MIB 23, and it was revealed that the crossover would replace a 23 Jump Street film.

In early 2015, a female-driven 21 Jump Street film was rumored to also be in the works. In December 2016, Rodney Rothman was confirmed to write and direct the film. In December 2018, Tiffany Haddish was confirmed to lead the film and Awkwafina is in talks. This idea has also yet to come to fruition.

References

External links
 
 
 

21 Jump Street
2010s police comedy films
2010s buddy cop films
2010s satirical films
2014 films
2014 comedy films
2014 action comedy films
American action comedy films
American buddy comedy films
American buddy cop films
American sequel films
American satirical films
Columbia Pictures films
2010s English-language films
Films directed by Phil Lord and Christopher Miller
Films about fraternities and sororities
Films based on television series
Films produced by Neal H. Moritz
Films scored by Mark Mothersbaugh
Films shot in New Orleans
Films with screenplays by Jonah Hill
Films with screenplays by Michael Bacall
Films with screenplays by Oren Uziel
Films with screenplays by Rodney Rothman
Media Rights Capital films
Metro-Goldwyn-Mayer films
Original Film films
Self-reflexive films
Films set in universities and colleges
2010s American films